This is a list of female athletes by sport. Each section is ordered alphabetical by the last name (originally or most commonly known). For specific groupings, see :Category:Sportswomen.

American football 

Tonya Butler
Sami Grisafe
Julie Harshbarger
Liz Heaston
Katie Hnida
Ashley Martin
Anita Marks
Patricia Palinkas
Natalie Randolph
Sarah Schkeeper
Lei'D Tapa
Jennifer Welter
Alissa Wykes

Archery 
Danielle Brown
Lindsey Carmichael
Miroslava Cerna
Mel Clarke
Gizem Girişmen
Fu Hongzhi
Gao Fangxia
Kim Ki Hee
Kim Ran Sook
Lenka Kuncova
Małgorzata Olejnik
Lee Hwa Sook
Marketa Sidkova
Xiao Yanhong

Athletics 

Veronica Campbell-Brown - 7 Olympic medals
Allyson Felix - 6 Olympic medals
Evelyn Ashford - 5 Olympic medals
Sanya Richards-Ross - 5 Olympic medals
Fanny Blankers-Koen - 4 Olympic medals
Betty Cuthbert - 4 Olympic medals
Cathy Freeman - 2 Olympic medals in running
Kim Gevaert - sprint runner
Florence Griffith Joyner - 5 Olympic medals
Wilma Glodean Rudolph - 4 Olympic medals in athletics
Kelly Holmes - 3 Olympic medals in middle distance running
Jackie Joyner-Kersee - 6 Olympic medals in athletics
Zhanna Pintusevich-Block - sprint runner, world 100-m & 200-m champion
Tamara Press - 6 world records (shot put & discus throw); 3x Olympic champion (2x shot put & discus) 
Irina Press - sprint runner, 2x Olympic champion (80-m hurdles & pentathlon)
Paula Radcliffe - long distance runner
Bobbie Rosenfeld - runner & long jumper, world record (100-yard dash); Olympic champion (4x100-m relay)
Joan Benoit Samuelson - Olympic medal in marathon running
Helen Stephens - 2 Olympic medals in athletics
Shirley Strickland - 7 Olympic medals
Irena Szewińska - sprinter & long jumper, 7 Olympic medals; world records (100-m, 200-m, and 400-m)
Grete Waitz - marathon running
Fatima Whitbread - 2 Olympic medals in javelin throw
Bärbel Wöckel - 4 Olympic medals
Joanna Zeiger - triathlete, Ironman 70.3 World champion; world record (half ironman)
Catherine Ibargüen - Colombian athlete, 2018 IAAF Female athlete of the year award, 2 Olympic medals in triple

Basketball 

Sue Bird, 4x WNBA champion, 5x Olympic champion
Tamika Catchings, WNBA champion, 4x Olympic champion, 
Cynthia Cooper-Dyke, 4x WNBA champion, Olympic champion
Lauren Jackson, 2x WNBA champion
Nancy Lieberman, WNBA, Olympic silver
Lisa Leslie, 2x WNBA champion, 4x Olympic champion
Cheryl Miller, Olympic champion
Maya Moore, 4x WNBA champion, 2x Olympic champion
Candace Parker, 2x WNBA champion, 2x Olympic champion 
Katie Smith, 3x WNBA champion, 3x Olympic champion
Dawn Staley, 3x Olympic champion
Sheryl Swoopes, 4 WNBA champion, 3x Olympic champion, 
Diana Taurasi, 3x WNBA champion, 5x Olympic champion

Cycling 

Elisa Longo Borghini
Emma Pooley

Fastpitch and Softball 
Monica Abbott
Christie Ambrosi
Crystl Bustos
Lauren Chamberlain
Jenny Dalton
Lisa Fernandez
Jennie Finch
Tairia Flowers
Amanda Freed
Michele Granger
Lauren Haeger
Tanya Harding
Lovieanne Jung
Danielle Lawrie
Jessica Mendoza
Stacey Nuveman
Cat Osterman
Dot Richardson
Michele Mary Smith
Natasha Watley

Fencing 
Emily Jacobson - saber fencer
Sada Jacobson - US saber fencer, ranked # 1 in the world, Olympic silver
Helene Mayer - foil fencer, Olympic champion
Maria Mazina - épée fencer, Olympic champion
 Ellen Osiier - foil fencer, Olympic champion
 Ellen Preis - foil fencing, 3x world champion (1947, 1949, and 1950), Olympic champion, 17x Austrian champion

Field hockey 

Luciana Aymar - 4 Olympic medals
Minke Booij - 3 Olympic medals
Giselle Kañevsky - Olympic medal
Natascha Keller - Olympic medal
Maartje Paumen - 2 Olympic gold medals
Fanny Rinne - Olympic medal

Figure skating 

Mao Asada
Oksana Baiul - Olympic champion and World Champion
Sasha Cohen - US Figure Skating Champion & Olympic silver
Peggy Gale Fleming
Dorothy Stuart Hamill
Sarah Hughes - Olympic champion
Yuna Kim
Lily Kronberger - four-time World Champion, World Figure Skating Hall of Fame
Michelle Kwan - two-time Olympic medalist, five-time World champion, and nine-time U.S. champion
Emilia Rotter - four-time World Champion
Irina Slutskaya - two-time World Champion
Kristi Tsuya Yamaguchi - Olympic champion two-time World champion, U.S. champion

Golf 

Amy Alcott - 5 LPGA majors
Patty Berg - 15 LPGA majors
Pat Bradley - 6 LPGA majors
Juli Inkster - 7 LPGA majors
Betsy King - 6 LPGA majors
Nancy Lopez - 3 LPGA majors
Betsy Rawls - 8 LPGA majors
Patty Sheehan - 6 LPGA majors
Annika Sörenstam - 10 LPGA majors
Louise Suggs - 11 LPGA majors
Karrie Webb - 7 LPGA majors
Kathy Whitworth - 6 LPGA majors
Michelle Wie - 1 LPGA major
Mickey Wright - 13 LPGA majors

Gymnastics 

Estella Agsteribbe - Olympic champion (team combined exercises)
Polina Astakhova - 10 Olympic medals
Simone Biles - 5 Olympic medals
Věra Čáslavská - 11 Olympic medals
Nadia Comăneci - 9 Olympic medals
Gabby Douglas - 3 Olympic medals
Laurie Hernandez - 4 Olympic medals
Shawn Johnson - 4 Olympic medals
Ágnes Keleti - 10 Olympic medals
Madison Kocian - 4 Olympic medals
Olga Korbut - 6 Olympic medals
Larisa Latynina - 18 Olympic medals
Tatiana Lysenko - 3 Olympic medals
Aly Raisman - 6 Olympic medals
Mary Lou Retton - 5 Olympic medals
Yelena Shushunova - two-time Olympic champion (all-around, team)

Ice hockey 

Karyn Bye
Natalie Darwitz
Danielle Goyette
Cammi Granato
Geraldine Heaney
Jayna Hefford
Angela James
Caroline Ouellette
Cherie Piper
Manon Rhéaume
Angela Ruggiero
Kim St-Pierre
Hayley Wickenheiser

Martial arts 

Laila Ali - boxing
Gina Carano - mixed martial arts
Dakota Ditcheva - Muay Thai
Hagar Finer - WIBF bantamweight boxing champion
Megumi Fujii - mixed martial arts
Cristiane Justino - mixed martial arts
Daniela Krukower - World Judo Champion
Christy Martin - boxing
Elaina Maxwell - mixed martial arts
Ronda Rousey - mixed martial arts
Miesha Tate - mixed martial arts
Joanna Jędrzejczyk - mixed martial arts

Motorsport 

Janet Guthrie - 11th at Indianapolis 500
Brittany Force - NHRA champion
Jutta Kleinschmidt - Dakar Rally winner
Katherine Legge - IMSA race winner
Ellen Lohr - DTM race winner
Elena Myers - AMA Supersport race winner
Michèle Mouton - World Rally Championship runner-up
Shirley Muldowney - NHRA champion
Danica Patrick - IndyCar race winner
Angelle Sampey - NHRA champion
Laia Sanz - Trial world champion
Lyn St. James - 9th at Indianapolis 500
Desiré Wilson - World Sportscar Championship race winner

Real tennis
Penny Fellows Lumley

Roller derby
Ann Calvello 
Joan Weston

Rugby 
Maggie Alphonsi
Enya Breen
Charlotte Caslick
Rochelle Clark 
Kendra Cocksedge
Lauren Doyle
Magali Harvey
Janai Haupapa
Natasha Hunt 
Zenay Jordaan
Huriana Manuel
Katherine Merchant
Ana Poghosian
Emily Scarratt
Cheryl Soon
Portia Woodman

Skiing 
Marit Bjørgen - 10 Olympic medals
Yuliya Chepalova - 6 Olympic medals
Aleisha Cline - Canadian cross skier, medalist at Winter X Games
Marja-Liisa Kirvesniemi - 7 Olympic medals
Janica Kostelić - 6 Olympic medals (4 gold)
Galina Kulakova - 8 Olympic medals
Larisa Lazutina - 7 Olympic medals
Raisa Smetanina - 10 Olympic medals
Yelena Välbe - 7 Olympic medals
Lyubov Yegorova - 9 Olympic medals

Snowboarding 
 Gretchen Bleiler
 Torah Bright
 Kelly Clark
 Tess Coady
 Linn Haug
 Elena Hight
 Kaitlyn Farrington
 Anna Gasser
 Jenny Jones
 Chloe Kim
 Maddie Mastro
 Silje Norendal
 Hannah Teter
 Alena Zavarzina

Soccer 
Michelle Akers
Nadine Angerer
Yael Averbuch
Lauren Barnes
Denise Bender
Verónica Boquete
Shannon Boxx
Brandi Chastain
Stephanie Cox
Julie Ertz
Joy Fawcett
Jess Fishlock
Mia Hamm
Lori Henry
Marbella Ibarra
Nahomi Kawasumi
Haley Kopmeyer
Sydney Leroux
Kristine Lilly
Kim Little
Carli Lloyd
Shannon MacMillan
Marta
Kate Markgraf
Merritt Mathias
Sharon McMurtry
Alex Morgan
Heather Mitts
Heather O'Reilly
 Ann Orrison
Cindy Parlow
Emily Pickering
Christen Press
Christie Rampone
Megan Rapinoe
Cat Reddick
Briana Scurry
Eudy Simelane
Christine Sinclair
Hope Solo
Aly Wagner
Abby Wambach
Chloe Williams
Kim Wyant

Surfing 
 Keely Andrew
 Heather Clark
 Courtney Conlogue
 Johanne Defay
 Sage Erickson
 Sally Fitzgibbons
 Maya Gabeira
 Stephanie Gilmore
 Bethany Hamilton
 Coco Ho
 Malia Jones
 Silvana Lima
 Malia Manuel
 Caroline Marks
 Carissa Moore
 Lakey Peterson
 Nikki Van Dijk
 Tatiana Weston-Webb
 Tyler Wright

Swimming 
Rebecca Adlington - 4 Olympic medals
Inge de Bruijn - 8 Olympic medals
Krisztina Egerszegi - 7 Olympic medals
Dawn Fraser - 8 Olympic medals
Jenny Thompson - 12 Olympic medals
Stephanie Rice - 3 Olympic medals
Keena Rothhammer - Olympic champion (800-m freestyle) and world champion (200-m freestyle); International Swimming Hall of Fame
Éva Székely - 2 Olympic medals
Dara Torres - 12 Olympic medals
Amy Van Dyken - 6 Olympic medals
Debbie Meyer - 3 Olympic Gold medals. 200,400,800 freestyle 1968. 15 individual World Records.

Table tennis 
Angelica Rozeanu - 17x table tennis world champion, Hall of Fame
Anna Sipos - 11x world table tennis champion, Hall of Fame

Tennis 

Victoria Azarenka - 2 Grand Slam singles titles
Jennifer Capriati - 3 Grand Slam singles titles
Margaret Court - 24 Grand Slam singles titles (11 in open-era)
Lindsay Davenport - 3 Grand Slam singles titles
Evonne Goolagong - 7 Grand Slam singles titles
Chris Evert - 18 Grand Slam singles titles
Steffi Graf - 22 Grand Slam singles titles
Justine Henin - 7 Grand Slam singles titles
Martina Hingis - 5 Grand Slam singles titles
Helen Jacobs - world singles ranking # 1
Billie Jean King - 12 Grand Slam singles titles
Angelique Kerber - 3 Grand Slam singles titles
Kim Clijsters - 4 Grand Slam singles titles
Ilana Kloss - world doubles ranking # 1
Garbiñe Muguruza - 2 Grand Slam singles titles
Li Na - 2 Grand Slam singles titles
Martina Navratilova - 18 Grand Slam singles titles
Naomi Osaka - 4 Grand Slam singles titles
Agnieszka Radwańska - world singles ranking # 2
Arantxa Sánchez - 4 Grand Slam singles titles
Monica Seles - 9 Grand Slam singles titles
Maria Sharapova - 5 Grand Slam singles titles
Serena Williams - 23 Grand Slam singles 
Venus Williams - 7 Grand Slam singles titles
Caroline Wozniacki - One Grand Slam singles title

Track and field 
Kajsa Bergqvist - high jumping
Rebekah Colberg - Olympic medals in discus and javelin throw
Jessica Ennis-Hill
Allyson Felix
Cathy Freeman
Yelena Isinbayeva
Carmelita Jeter
Marion Jones
Florence Griffith Joyner
Jackie Joyner-Kersee
Ann Penelope Marston - Archery
Wilma Glodean Rudolph
Mary Decker
Babe Didrikson Zaharias

Volleyball 
Foluke Akinradewo, 3 Olympic medals
Lindsey Berg, 2 Olympic medals 
Jordan Larson,  3 Olympic medals
April Ross, 3 Olympic medals
Danielle Scott-Arruda, 2 Olympic medals
Logan Tom, 2 Olympic medals 
Misty May-Treanor, 3 Olympic medals
Kerri Walsh Jennings, 4 Olympic medals

Other sports 
Kayla Harrison - 2 Olympic Gold Medals & 2 Pan American Games Gold Medals in Judo
Josée Auclair - explorer
Ann Bancroft - explorer
Bonnie Kathleen Blair - speedskater
Susan Butcher - sled dog musher
Zefania Carmel - world champion yachtsman
Ellen van Dijk - world road and track cycling champion
Vonetta Flowers - Olympic medal in bobsleigh
Myriam Fox-Jerusalmi - slalom canoer, Olympic bronze (K-1 slalom), 5 golds at ICF Canoe Slalom World Championships (2x K-1, 3x K-1 team)
Taoying Fu - 4 Paralympic medals in powerlifting
Sue Sally Hale - Broke the gender barrier in American Polo, was the highest rated American woman polo player of her era.
Liz Heaston - first woman to play and score in a college football game
Debbie Lee - Australian rules football
Judit Polgár - chess 
Libby Riddles - sled dog musher

See also

Lists of sportspeople
Women's sports
Women's National Team
Women's professional sports
Major women's sport leagues in North America
International Women's Sports Hall of Fame
Women's Basketball Hall of Fame
Women's association football
Women's Australian rules football
All-American Girls Professional Baseball League players

References